Hinnotefjellet is a mountain in Lom Municipality in Innlandet county, Norway. The mountain is surrounded by several other notable mountains including Reinstinden to the east; Storådalshøi and Høgtunga to the south; Semeltinden to the west; Søre Hellstugutinden, Nestsøre Hellstugutinden, Store Hellstugutinden and Midtre Hellstugutinden to the northwest; and the Memurutindene mountains to the northeast. The Vestre Memurubrean glacier lies north of this mountain.

See also
List of mountains of Norway by height

References

Jotunheimen
Lom, Norway
Mountains of Innlandet